Warren Anderson (born April 13, 1952) is a Canadian former professional ice hockey player. He played with Team Canada at the 1980 Winter Olympics and the 1984 Winter Olympics.

Career 
Prior to the Olympics, Anderson played with the Oshawa Generals and had an all-star, five-year stay with the Toronto Varsity Blues men's ice hockey team, winning four national championships. In 2013, he was inducted into the Toronto Varsity Blues Hall of Fame.

Career statistics

Regular season and playoffs

International

References

External links

1952 births
Living people
Canadian ice hockey defencemen
Ice hockey players at the 1980 Winter Olympics
Ice hockey players at the 1984 Winter Olympics
Olympic ice hockey players of Canada
Ice hockey people from Toronto